Weber's dwarf squirrel (Prosciurillus weberi) is a species of rodent in the family Sciuridae. It is endemic to northern and western Sulawesi, Indonesia. Its natural habitat is subtropical or tropical dry forests.

References

Thorington, R. W. Jr. and R. S. Hoffman. 2005. Family Sciuridae. pp. 754–818 in Mammal Species of the World a Taxonomic and Geographic Reference. D. E. Wilson and D. M. Reeder eds. Johns Hopkins University Press, Baltimore.

Prosciurillus
Rodents of Sulawesi
Mammals described in 1890
Taxonomy articles created by Polbot
Taxa named by Fredericus Anna Jentink